Maureen Stewart (30 March 1965 – 16 September 1994) was a Costa Rican middle-distance runner. She competed in the women's 800 metres at the 1988 Summer Olympics.

She died in Anguilla of cardiac arrest.

References

External links

1965 births
1994 deaths
Athletes (track and field) at the 1988 Summer Olympics
Costa Rican female middle-distance runners
Olympic athletes of Costa Rica